J. R. R. Tolkien (1892–1973) was a famous British philologist and author, best known for The Lord of the Rings.

Tolkien is the surname of:
Edith Tolkien (1889–1971), J. R. R. Tolkien's wife
Christopher Tolkien (1924–2020), J. R. R. Tolkien's third and youngest son
Simon Tolkien (born 1959), writer, Christopher Tolkien's son
Tim Tolkien (born 1962), sculptor, J. R. R. Tolkien's great-nephew

Tolkien may also refer to:
Tolkien (film), a 2019 American biographical drama about J. R. R. Tolkien
2675 Tolkien, an asteroid named after J. R. R. Tolkien
Tolkien Estate, legal body that owns the rights to J. R. R. Tolkien's works
J.R. Tolkien (schooner), a gaff-topsail schooner of Netherlands registry used for passenger cruises on the Baltic Sea and elsewhere in European waters
 Tolkien (crater), a crater on Mercury
 Tolkien Black, a character from South Park, who was previously known as Token Black and earlier Token Williams

See also
Tolkien family
Tolkin
Toelken

German-language surnames